Suza (also Romanized as Sūzā and Sooza; also known as Shūzeh, Sūreh, Sūzeh, and Bandar-e Sūzā) is a coastal city and capital of Shahab District, in Qeshm County, Hormozgan Province, Iran. It should not be confused with the ancient city of Susa, located in Khuzestan, Iran.

References 

Populated places in Qeshm County
Cities in Hormozgan Province

Populated coastal places in Iran
Port cities and towns of the Persian Gulf
Port cities and towns in Iran